Zolotodolinskaya Street is a street in Akademgorodok of Novosibirsk, Russia. It starts from Morskoy Prospekt, runs south-west, crosses Uchyonykh Street, then forms a crossroad with Voyevodsky and Maltsev streets and ends near Kirovo Settlement.

Organizations
 Exhibition Center of the Siberian Branch of the RAS
 Viktoria Fencing Club is a sports club founded in 1968
 Museum of history and culture of the peoples of Siberia and the Far East
 Museum of the SB RAS

Gallery

Notable residents

 Andrey Bitsadze (1916–1994) was a Soviet mathematician and mechanic.
 Anatoly Derevyanko (born 1943) is a Soviet/Russian historian and archaeologist.
 Vasily Fomin (born 1940) is a Soviet and Russian mechanic.
 Michail Ivanov (1945—2013) was a Soviet and Russian scientist in the field of applied mathematics.
 Mikhail Lavrentyev (1900—1980) was a Soviet mathematician and hydrodynamicist, founder of the SB RAS
 Mikhail Lavrentyev (1932–2010) was a Soviet and Russian scientist in the field of mathematical physics. The son of Mikhail Lavrentyev.
 Gury Marchuk (1925–2013) was a Soviet and Russian scientist in the fields of computational mathematics, and physics of atmosphere.
 Vyacheslav Molodin (born 1948) is a Soviet and Russian historian
 Valentin Monakhov (1932—2006) was a Soviet and Russian mathematician and mechanic, a specialist in the field of hydrodynamics.
 Lev Ovsyannikov (1919–2014) was a Soviet/Russian mathematician and mechanic.
 Pelageya Polubarinova-Kochina was a Soviet applied mathematician.
 Alexey Rebrov (born 1933) is a Soviet and Russian scientist in the field of physical gas dynamics, rarefied gas dynamics, thermal physics and vacuum technology.
 Alexander Skrinsky (born 1936) is a Russian nuclear physicist.
 Vladimir Vragov (1945—2002) was a Soviet and Russian mathematician.
 Nikolai Yanenko (1921–1984) was a Soviet scientist in the field of computational mathematics and fluid mechanics.

Nature
 Central Siberian Botanic Garden
 Utinoye Ozero is a pond between Zolotodolinskaya and Maltsev streets.

References

Streets in Novosibirsk
Sovetsky District, Novosibirsk